Hideyoshi Enrique Arakaki Chinen (born 2 February 1998) is a Peruvian professional footballer who plays as a right winger for Peruvian club Cusco FC.

Club career
Arakaki excelled with Universidad San Martín during the 2015 Torneo de Promoción y Reserva, the national under-20 league, prompting his call-up to the first team by manager José del Solar the following year. He made his Peruvian Primera División debut on 10 February 2016, scoring the game-winner in the 47th minute of a 2–1 victory over Comerciantes Unidos.

Arakaki signed with FBC Melgar ahead of the 2018 season. He made his continental debut during the 2019 Copa Libertadores qualifying stages, scoring with an impressive strike from outside the box in their 2–0 home victory over Caracas FC on 19 February. In December 2019 he signed a one-year extension with the club.

On 8 December 2021, Arakaki signed with UTC.

International career
Arakaki has represented his country internationally at various age groups. He was part of the team that won the 2013 South American U-15 Championship for Peru, their first-ever title, while going undefeated in the tournament. He scored a brace in their 4–4 draw with Argentina and added another goal in their semi-final victory over Chile. He then played with the national under-17 team at the 2015 South American U-17 Championship before appearing with the Peru U20s at the 2016 Copa de los Andes as well as the Peru U23s during the 2019 Pan American Games in Lima.

Personal life
Arakaki is of Japanese descendence. His grandparents were born in Japan, but his parents, Genoveva and Luis Enrique, were both born in Peru.

Honours

International
Peru U15
 South American U-15 Championship: 2013

References

External links
 
 
 

Living people
1998 births
Peruvian footballers
Peru youth international footballers
Association football wingers
Club Deportivo Universidad de San Martín de Porres players
FBC Melgar footballers
Deportivo Municipal footballers
Universidad Técnica de Cajamarca footballers
Peruvian Primera División players
Footballers at the 2019 Pan American Games
Pan American Games competitors for Peru
Footballers from Lima
Peruvian people of Japanese descent
Peru under-20 international footballers
21st-century Peruvian people